The sixth and final season of the television comedy series Community premiered on Yahoo! Screen on March 17, 2015, with a two-episode premiere, and concluded on June 2, 2015. The season consists of 13 episodes released weekly via Yahoo! Screen on Tuesdays. Yahoo! announced in June 2014 that it had picked up the series for a sixth season after NBC had canceled the series in May 2014.

Cast

Starring
 Joel McHale as Jeff Winger
 Gillian Jacobs as Britta Perry
 Danny Pudi as Abed Nadir
 Alison Brie as Annie Edison
 Jim Rash as Dean Craig Pelton
 Ken Jeong as Ben Chang

Recurring
 Paget Brewster as Francesca "Frankie" Dart
 Keith David as Elroy Patashnik
 Erik Charles Nielsen as Garrett Lambert
 Richard Erdman as Leonard Briggs
 Danielle Kaplowitz as Vicki Jenkins
 David Neher as Todd Jacobson
 Darsan Solomon as Dave
 Yvette Nicole Brown as Shirley Bennett
 Martin Mull as George Perry
 Lesley Ann Warren as Deb Perry
 Craig Cackowski as Officer Cackowski

Guest stars
 Steve Agee as David ("Modern Espionage")
 Matt Berry as Roger DeSalvo ("Grifting 101")
 Matt Besser as Blake ("Basic RV Repair and Palmistry")
 Brooke Burns as TV Host ("Intro to Recycled Cinema")
 Jay Chandrasekhar as Gupta Gupti Gupta ("Basic Email Security")
 Irene Choi as Annie Kim ("Queer Studies and Advanced Waxing")
 Wayne Federman as The Dad ("Emotional Consequences of Broadcast Television")
 Nathan Fillion as Bob Waite ("Ladders")
 Matt Gourley as Briggs Hatton ("Wedding Videography" )
 Seth Green as Scrunch ("Emotional Consequences of Broadcast Television")
 Steve Guttenberg as Maury ("Intro to Recycled Cinema")
 Mitchell Hurwitz as Preston Koogler ("Modern Espionage")
 Jeremy Scott Johnson as Carl Bladt ("Queer Studies and Advanced Waxing")
 O-Lan Jones as Garrett's Mom ("Wedding Videography")
 Charley Koontz as Neil ("Basic Email Security")
 Lisa Loeb as Julie ("Advanced Safety Features")
 Jason Mantzoukas as Matt Lundergard ("Queer Studies and Advanced Waxing")
 Kumail Nanjiani as Lapari ("Modern Espionage")
 Brady Novak as Richie Countee ("Queer Studies and Advanced Waxing")
 Randall Park as himself ("Intro to Recycled Cinema")
 Justin Roiland as the Voice of Ice Cube Head ("Emotional Consequences of Broadcast Television")
 Danielle Schneider as Karen ("Basic RV Repair and Palmistry")
 Travis Schuldt as Rick/Subway ("Advanced Safety Features")
 Dino Stamatopoulos as Alex "Star-Burns" Osbourne ("Modern Espionage")
 Brian Van Holt as Willy Sebert Smith ("Laws of Robotics and Party Rights")
 Luke Youngblood as Magnitude ("Intro to Recycled Cinema")
 David St. James as Professor Albrecht ("Ladders")
 Steven Weber as Detective Butcher ("Ladders")
 Billy Zane as Honda Boss ("Advanced Safety Features")
 Erin McGathy as Stacy ("Wedding Videography")

Episodes

Production
On May 9, 2014, NBC announced that it had canceled Community. For several years prior to its cancelation, fans adopted the slogan "six seasons and a movie", a line from the episode "Paradigms of Human Memory" regarding Abed's hopeful legacy of NBC's short-lived series The Cape. Sony Pictures Television, the show's primary producer, was reported to have shopped the show to other networks and online distribution outlets, including Hulu and Comedy Central. Deadline Hollywood reported the low chance of such an outcome, with a revival deal from one unnamed suitor not likely to happen and creator Dan Harmon's enthusiasm for continuing on the show uncertain. On May 28, Deadline.com reported that Hulu was in talks with Sony Pictures TV to produce a new season of Community, with Harmon having a change of heart about the revival, saying, "I'm not going to be the guy that re-cancels cancelled Community." On June 24, TVLine reported that Hulu had ended talks with Sony Pictures TV, although The Wrap stated the report was incorrect. On June 30, the day the cast's contracts were due to expire, Yahoo! announced it had ordered a 13-episode sixth season to stream on Yahoo! Screen. The main cast return along with executive producers Dan Harmon, Chris McKenna, Russ Krasnoff and Gary Foster. Harmon said, "I am very pleased that Community will be returning for its predestined sixth season on Yahoo ... I look forward to bringing our beloved NBC sitcom to a larger audience by moving it online." For season six, the series moved shooting locations from Paramount Studios to CBS Radford, which is twice the size of the previous shooting set.

In August 2014, it was announced that the Russo brothers would direct the season premiere, however, this did not come to fruition. Writing began in September 2014, and filming began in November 2014. Unlike most streaming programs, the sixth season were released weekly, as opposed to being released all at once. In September 2014, it was announced that Yvette Nicole Brown, who plays Shirley, would not return for season six due to a family emergency; however, Brown returned in guest appearances in "Ladders" and "Emotional Consequences of Broadcast Television". Paget Brewster and Keith David (Brewster previously guest-starred on the series as a different character and David provided a voice-over role) were cast as regulars for the season in November 2014; Brewster plays Francesca "Frankie" Dart, a consultant to help improve Greendale, and David plays Elroy Patashnik, a retired inventor who now searches to reinvent himself at Greendale. In November 2014, it was announced that Martin Mull and Lesley Ann Warren would guest star as Britta's parents, George and Deb Perry, in the second episode of the season. The cast and crew celebrated the making of their 100th episode on December 8, 2014.

In February 2015, Dan Harmon announced that Steve Guttenberg would guest star in an episode. In February 2015, it was confirmed that Billy Zane would play "a mysterious, nameless man scouting Britta for a unique talent" and that Travis Schuldt would return as Subway/Rick. In March 2015, the trailer for season 6 was released, and parodies the Avengers: Age of Ultron trailer in its logo, theme and coloring.

On March 15, 2015, it was announced that the series began filming a new "paintball" episode, "Modern Espionage", following the season one episode "Modern Warfare" and season two episodes "A Fistful of Paintballs" and "For a Few Paintballs More". Filming for season six ended on March 27, 2015.

On July 30, 2015, Joel McHale stated that Yahoo! "wanted to [make more seasons of Community], but all of [the actor's] contracts were up after six years." McHale later clarified his statement via Twitter, saying "Community is not canceled." Yahoo released a statement: "We've seen tremendous value in our partnership with Sony and are continuing to discuss future opportunities for Community." Harmon said he "could have said yes immediately" to season seven, but "given the actors' velocity and trajectory" decided in favor of "getting [the cast] back together for an awesome movie." On October 21, 2015, Yahoo CFO Ken Goldman announced during a Q3 earnings phone call that their original programming lineup last spring resulted in a $42 million dollar writeoff, including Sin City Saints and Other Space. On January 4, 2016, Yahoo announced it had shut down its Yahoo Screen service, with season 6 episodes being moved to Yahoo TV for continued public viewing.

Availability
Episodes were available to stream via Yahoo! Screen and Hulu in the U.S., Taiwan, Hong Kong, Singapore, Malaysia, and Indonesia.

In the United Kingdom, the show aired on Sony Entertainment Television starting March 18, 2015. In Australia, the sixth season was available on Stan beginning March 17, 2015.

On September 9, 2015, Yahoo! Screen released Communitary, an extra version of season six with commentary by series creator Dan Harmon.

The sixth season was released on DVD in region 1 on March 8, 2016. Special features included deleted scenes, a behind-the-scenes  featurette on the making of the finale, trivia with the cast and crew, and a gag reel.

As of April 1, 2020, all six seasons became available on Netflix in the United Kingdom, Canada and the United States.

Reception

Critical response
The sixth season has received positive reviews from critics. On Metacritic, it has a score of 78 out of 100 based on 12 reviews, indicating "generally favorable reviews". On Rotten Tomatoes, season 6 holds an 89% approval rating from 37 critics with an average rating of 8 out of 10. The consensus reads, "Despite cast and broadcast changes, Community manages to remain at the top of its quirky class."

Ratings
On April 1, 2015, three weeks into the sixth season's run, Harmon detailed the series viewership on Yahoo! Screen. Exclaiming "Everybody in the world watches Community, now we know, now that we're not being measured by Nielsen [...] Surprise surprise you know, Yahoo knows how to count the clicks, and guess what? Holy shit! Jesus christ! Like you always knew!" Harmon stated he couldn't give specific numbers, saying "They have data, I'm not really asking, and they're not telling, but you know lips were loose at the drunken wrap party, enough for me to go 'holy shit. That's what I always would've guessed, times two or three'. I always knew there was like way more people watching this shit than what ever that .9 represented."

See also
 List of original programs distributed by Yahoo!

References

External links
 
 

Community (TV series) seasons
2015 American television seasons